Tiyuguan Road Subdistrict, or Tiyuguanlu Subdistrict is a southeastern subdistrict of the Dongcheng District, Beijing, China. In 2020 the population here is 31,977.

This subdistrict got its name from the Tiyuguan Road within the subdistrict, which in turn was named after the Beijing Gymnasium.

History

Administrative Division 
As of 2021, there are a total of 8 communities under the subdistrict. They are listed as follows:

Landmark 

 Beijing Gymnasium

References 

Dongcheng District, Beijing
Subdistricts of Beijing